Tánluán  (476–542) was a Chinese Buddhist monk. He is credited by Hōnen as the founder of Pure Land Buddhism in China. He is also considered the Third Patriarch of Jōdo Shinshū, a popular school of Buddhism in Japan.

Tanluan was originally a Buddhist scholar, but after becoming ill, he studied Taoism in order to seek the Elixir of Life. However, after an encounter with Bodhiruci, a Buddhist monk from India, Tanluan became a devotee of Pure Land Buddhism and burnt his Taoist texts.

Tanluan later wrote his Commentary on Vasubandhu's Treatise on the Pure Land. The commentary taught that the all beings could be reborn in Sukhavati, the pure land of Amitābha, through sincere nianfo (recitation of a Buddha's name). 

Tanluan also had a strong impact on Daochuo, revered as the Fourth Patriarch of the Jōdo Shinshū school, who once visited his temple.

References

Literature 
 Inagaki, Hisao : T'an-luan's Commentary on Vasubandhu's Discourse on the Pure Land, A Study and Translation [T. 40, 1819] ; Kyōto, Nagata Bunshōdō, 1998. 
 Tanluan: Commentaire au Traité de la naissance dans la Terre Pure de Vasubandhu, texte établi, annoté et traduit par Jérôme Ducor (Bibliothèque chinoise, vol. 31); Paris, Les Belles Lettres, 2021; 310 pp.
 Shinko Mochizuki, Leo M. Pruden,Trans. (2000). Pure Land Buddhism in China: A Doctrinal History, Chapter 7: T'an-luan. In: Pacific World Journal, Third Series, Number 2, 149–165. Archived from the original
 Yukio Yamada (2000). T'an-luan's Theory of Two Kinds of Dharma-body as Found in Shinran's Wago Writings, Pacific World Journal, Third Series, Number 2, 99-113. Archived from the original
 Ryusei Takeda (2000). The Theoretical Structure of "Birth in the Pure Land": Based on the Meaning of T'an-luan's "Birth through Causal Conditions", Pacific World Journal, Third Series, Number 2, 31–60. Archived from the original
 Shoji Matsumoto (1986). The Modern Relevance of Donran's Pure Land Buddhist Thought, Pacific World Journal New Series 2, 36-41

476 births
572 deaths
Northern Wei Buddhist monks
Converts to Buddhism
Chinese spiritual writers
People from Xinzhou
Writers from Shanxi
Jōdo Shin patriarchs